
Gmina Iłów is a rural gmina (administrative district) in Sochaczew County, Masovian Voivodeship, in east-central Poland.

Villages
Gmina Iłów contains the villages and settlements of: 
 
 Aleksandrów
 Arciechów
 Arciechówek
 Białocin
 Bieniew
 Brzozów Nowy
 Brzozów Stary
 Brzozówek
 Brzozowiec
 Budy Iłowskie
 Dobki
 Emilianów
 Emilianów Załuskowski
 Gilówka Dolna
 Gilówka Górna
 Giżyce
 Giżyczki
 Henryków
 Iłów
 Kaptury
 Karłowo
 Kępa Karolińska
 Krzyżyk Iłowski
 Łady
 Lasotka
 Łaziska
 Leśniaki
 Lubatka
 Miękinki
 Miękiny
 Narty
 Obory
 Olszowiec
 Olunin
 Ostrowce
 Paulinka
 Pieczyska Iłowskie
 Pieczyska Łowickie
 Piotrów
 Piskorzec
 Przejma
 Rokocina
 Rzepki
 Sadowo
 Sewerynów
 Stegna
 Suchodół
 Szarglew
 Uderz
 Wieniec
 Władysławów
 Wola Ładowska
 Wołyńskie
 Wszeliwy
 Zalesie 
 Załusków

Neighbouring gminas
Gmina Iłów is bordered by the gminas of Kiernozia, Kocierzew Południowy, Mała Wieś, Młodzieszyn, Rybno, Sanniki, Słubice and Wyszogród.

References
Polish official population figures 2006

Ilow
Sochaczew County